Syrian Post is the company responsible for postal service in Syria and was established by virtue of the organizational decree No. 1936 dated 1975-07-10. 
The company is legally incorporated as a cooperative.

Universal Postal Union 
Syria joined the Universal Postal Union on May 15, 1946

History 

French, Egyptian and Ottoman stamps have been used in Syria prior to it becoming an independent state.

References

External links
 

Communications in Syria
Postal organizations
Companies of Syria